Butman Corners is an unincorporated community located in the town of Gale, Trempealeau County, Wisconsin, United States. The community was named for Stark and Hiram Butman, who came from Ohio in the early 1850s.

Notes

Unincorporated communities in Trempealeau County, Wisconsin
Unincorporated communities in Wisconsin